Archie Spigner (August 27, 1928 – October 29, 2020) was an African-American politician who served in the New York City Council from 1974 to 2001. He was born in Orangeburg, South Carolina.

On the city council, he represented south-east Queens. He was also influential in races for other positions. He was called the "godfather of politics in southeastern Queens" by Gregory Meeks due to his ability to control who got elected from that area.

He died on October 29, 2020, in Queens, New York City, New York at age 92. The cause was cancer.

References

1928 births
2020 deaths
People from Orangeburg, South Carolina
New York City Council members
New York (state) Democrats
African-American New York City Council members
Deaths from cancer in New York (state)
20th-century African-American people
21st-century African-American people